The Students were an American doo-wop vocal group, which formed in Cincinnati, Ohio, United States, in 1957.  Although they only released four sides, two of them – "I'm So Young" and "Every Day of the Week" – became doo-wop standards.  "I'm So Young" in particular became popular and durable, and has been covered by the Beach Boys, Rosie and the Originals, The Ronettes and Kid Kyle and "The Students". 

The Students won the second-place prize at the amateur talent show at the Apollo Theater in New York City in 1956. Their winning song, "Jenny Lee" (composed by “Prez” Tyus, who also wrote “I’m So Young”), was later released as the B-side of a song by the Heartbreakers (which was live at the Apollo, also in 1956) on Fordham Records in 1964.

Both "I'm So Young" and "Every Day of the Week" were written by William H. "Prez" Tyus, Jr., a local Cincinnati high schooler. Tyus wrote the songs and gave them to a local African-American vocal group called the D'Italians. After the group secured a recording contract with Checker Records, they renamed themselves the Students, and it was under this name that Tyus's two songs were recorded.

On May 29, 1961, the Students original of "I'm So Young"  on Argo Records, reached No. 26 on the US Billboard R&B chart. 

On their recordings, all lead vocal parts were undertaken by Leroy King.

Members
Leroy King, lead vocal
Dorsey Porter, first tenor
John Ford, second tenor
John Bolden, baritone
Richard Johnson, bass
Ralph Byrd, guitar

Discography
On Fordham Records
109 "Jenny Lee" (Prez Tyus) (split 45 with the Heartbreakers recording of "Come Back My Love") - 1964 (recorded in 1956)

On Note Records
10012 "I'm So Young" / "Every Day Of The Week" - 1958
10013 "Wazoo!!" / "Shuffle Stroll" - Jimmy Coe Orchestra - 1958 (The Students sang backup on Coe's recording of "Wazoo!!")
10019 "My Vow To You" / "That's How I Feel" - 1959

On Chess Records
 Checker Records (subsidiary of Chess)
9024 "I'm So Young" / "Every Day Of The Week" - 1958
1004 "My Vow To You" / "That's How I Feel" - 1962
9024 "I'm So Young" / "My Vow To You" - 1973
 Argo Records (another subsidiary of Chess)
5386 "I'm So Young" / "Every Day Of The Week" - 1961
 Cadet Records (another subsidiary of Chess; note: same catalog numbers as Argo)
5386 I'm So Young" / "Every Day Of The Week" - 1964

References

Doo-wop groups
Musical groups established in 1957
Musical groups disestablished in 1962
Musical groups from Cincinnati
1957 establishments in Ohio